Mankurt is the term for an unthinking slave in Chinghiz Aitmatov's novel The Day Lasts More Than a Hundred Years.

According to Aitmatov's fictional legend, mankurts were prisoners of war who were turned into non-autonomous docile servants by exposing camel skin wrapped around their heads to the heat of the sun. These skins dried tight, like a steel band, causing brain damage and figurative zombification. Mankurts did not recognise their name, family or tribe—"a mankurt did not recognise himself as a human being".

In Aitmatov's novel, a young man defending his homeland from invasion by the nomadic Ruanruan is captured, tortured, and brainwashed into serving his homeland's conquerors. Having completely lost his memory, he kills his mother when she attempts to rescue him from captivity. In the later years of the Soviet Union mankurt entered everyday speech to describe the alienation that people had toward a society that repressed them and distorted their history.

Aitmatov did not take the idea from tradition but invented it himself. N. Shneidman stated "The mankurt motif, taken from Central Asian lore, is the dominant idea of the novel and connects the different narrative levels and time sequences".

Etymology and usage
"Mankurt" may be derived from the Mongolian term "мангуурах" (manguurakh, meaning "stupid"), Turkic mengirt (one who was deprived memory) or (less probably) man kort (bad tribe).

In the figurative sense, the word "mankurt" refers to people who have lost touch with their ethnic homeland, who have forgotten their kinship. In this sense, it has become a term in common parlance and journalism. In Russian, there have appeared neologisms such as mankurtizm, mankurtizatsiya (meaning "mankurtization"), and demankurtizatsiya (meaning "demankurtization"). In some former Soviet republics, the term has come to represent those non-Russians who have lost their ethnic heritage by the effects of the Soviet system.

In cinema
In 1990, the film Mankurt (Манкурт) was released in the Soviet Union. Written by Mariya Urmadova, the film is based on one narrative strand in the novel The Day Lasts More Than a Hundred Years. It represents the last film directed by Khodzha Narliyev.

See also
 Ethnic cleansing
 Authoritarian personality
 Heart of a Dog
 Homo Sovieticus
 Peon
 Pitchcapping
 Vatnik (slang)

References

External links
 «И дольше века длится день»

Turkic mythology
Turkish words and phrases
Pejorative terms for people